Sjoerd van Ginneken (born 6 November 1992) is a Dutch former professional racing cyclist, who competed professionally between 2014 and 2019 for the  and  teams.

Major results

2014
 3rd Baronie Breda Classic
 4th Overall Czech Cycling Tour
1st  Young rider classification
1st Stage 1 (TTT)
 8th Overall Okolo Slovenska
1st  Young rider classification
2018
 6th Antwerp Port Epic
 7th Druivenkoers Overijse
2019
 7th Grote Prijs Jef Scherens
 9th Clásica de Almería
 9th Ronde van Overijssel

References

External links
 

1992 births
Living people
Dutch male cyclists
Sportspeople from Roosendaal
Cyclists from North Brabant
20th-century Dutch people
21st-century Dutch people